Down Home Blues is an album by blues musicians Brownie McGhee and Sonny Terry recorded in 1960 and released on the Bluesville label.

Reception

AllMusic reviewer Bruce Eder stated: "the music itself stands outside of time. McGhee's strumming and singing have enough polish to pass as a commercial recording, but at its best, it's still sufficiently unaffected so as to be regarded as authentic country-blues. It's Terry's harp, however, that really pulls this body of music back to its roots ... the dominant elements of this album are the charm and honesty that Terry and McGhee offer, whatever their particular style on a specific song; they had portions of both to spare by the bucketload, which accounts for the 15 years that they held audiences in their spell".

Track listing
All compositions by Brownie McGhee except where noted
 "Let Me Be Your Big Dog" – 3:16
 "Pawn Shop" – 3:29
 "You Dont Know" – 2:51
 "Betty and Dupree's Blues" – 6:18
 "Back to New Orleans" (Brownie McGhee, Sonny Terry) – 3:00
 "Stranger Here" (McGhee, Terry) – 3:37 	
 "Fox Hunt" (McGhee, Terry) – 2:33	
 "I'm Prison Bound" – 3:04	
 "Louise, Louise" – 4:00
 "Baby, How Long" – 4:14	
 "Freight Train" (McGhee, Terry) – 2:35

Personnel

Performance
Sonny Terry – harmonica, vocals
Brownie McGhee – guitar, vocals

Production
 Rudy Van Gelder – engineer

References

Brownie McGhee albums
Sonny Terry albums
1960 albums
Bluesville Records albums
Albums recorded at Van Gelder Studio